Heinrich Gloe House is a historic home located near Rhineland, Montgomery County, Missouri.  It was built between 1852 and 1855, and is 1 to -story, triple-pen dogtrot frontier home constructed of hewn oak logs with full dovetail joints.  The building rests on a flagstone basement and foundation and reflects the style and practices of traditional architecture patterns of European immigrants.

It was listed on the National Register of Historic Places in 2007.

References

Houses on the National Register of Historic Places in Missouri
Log houses
Houses completed in 1855
Buildings and structures in Montgomery County, Missouri
National Register of Historic Places in Montgomery County, Missouri